Sweets is an album by American jazz trumpeter Harry Edison and His Orchestra recorded in 1956 and originally released on the Clef label.

Reception

Allmusic awarded the album 4½ stars stating "Sweets is one of the quintessential Edison albums showcasing the former Count Basie bandmember at the height of his abilities with a stellar ensemble of other Basie-ites".

Track listing
All compositions by Harry Edison except as indicated
 "Hollering at the Watkins" - 3:37
 "Used to Be Basie" - 6:01
 "How Deep Is the Ocean?" (Irving Berlin) - 3:47
 "Studio Call" - 8:11
 "Willow Weep for Me" (Ann Ronell) - 4:49
 "Opus 711" - 5:08
 Love Is Here to Stay" (George Gershwin, Ira Gershwin) - 3:23
 "K.M. Blues" - 3:35
 "Walkin' with Sweets" - 7:13

Personnel 
Harry Edison - trumpet
Ben Webster - tenor saxophone
Jimmy Rowles - piano
Barney Kessel - guitar
Joe Mondragon - bass
Alvin Stoller - drums

References 

1956 albums
Harry Edison albums
Clef Records albums
Verve Records albums
Albums produced by Norman Granz